Henry VII may refer to:

 Henry VII of England (1457–1509), King of England and Lord of Ireland from 1485 until his death in 1509; the founder of the House of Tudor
 Henry VII, Duke of Bavaria (died 1047), count of Luxembourg (as Henry II) from 1026 and duke of Bavaria from 1042 until his death
 Henry (VII) of Germany (1211–1242), King of Sicily from 1212, Duke of Swabia from 1216, and King of Germany from 1220
 Henry VII, Holy Roman Emperor (c. 1273–1313), King of Germany from 1308 and Holy Roman Emperor from 1312
 Henry VII, Count of Schwarzburg-Blankenburg (13th-century–1324), also known as Henry VI, the ruling Count of Schwarzburg-Blankenburg from 1285 until his death
 Henry VII Rumpold (c. 1350–1395), Duke of Żagań-Głogów during 1368–1378 and ruler over half of Głogów, Ścinawa and Bytom Odrzański since 1378
 Henry VII, Count of Waldeck (14th-century–15th-century), Count of Waldeck from 1397 until his death
 Henri, Count of Paris (1933–2019), Orléanist pretender to the defunct French throne as Henry VII